Rosendo Ayres Ribeiro, MD (Goa, 1871 — London, 2 February 1951) was a Portuguese physician and diplomat.

Career 
He arrived in Mombasa in May 1889 and later, as Goa was part of the Portuguese Empire, was entitled Vice-Consul of Portugal in Nairobi.

He was Kenya’s first private medical practitioner and the first to diagnose bubonic plague in this country. Curiously, he used to ride a zebra he himself tamed to attend his patients' house calls.

Ayres Ribeiro is a recipient of the Order of British Empire for the extent of his benevolent works in Kenya.

References 

1871 births
1951 deaths
Portuguese diplomats
Portuguese people of Goan descent
Portuguese general practitioners
Kenyan general practitioners
19th-century Portuguese physicians
20th-century Kenyan physicians
Kenyan people of Goan descent